Artem Kostyantynovych Bilyi (born 3 October 1999) is a Ukrainian professional footballer who plays as a central midfielder for Latvian club Liepāja.

Career
On 29 December 2022, Van announced that Bilyi had left the club.

On 9 January 2023, Bilyi signed for Liepāja.

References

External links
 Profile on Metalist Kharkiv official website
 

1999 births
Living people
Ukrainian footballers
Ukrainian expatriate footballers
People from Novomoskovsk
Association football midfielders
FC Zorya Luhansk players
FC Chornomorets Odesa players
FC Vorskla Poltava players
FC VPK-Ahro Shevchenkivka players
FC Vovchansk players
FC Metalist Kharkiv players
FC Van players
Ukrainian Premier League players
Ukrainian First League players
Sportspeople from Dnipropetrovsk Oblast
Expatriate footballers in Armenia
Ukrainian expatriate sportspeople in Armenia